Milestone is a small village in the townland of Graniara in County Tipperary, Ireland. It lies on the R503 Thurles to Limerick Regional Road where it is joined by the R497 Nenagh - Tipperary Town road. 

It is located in the Slieve Felim Mountains.

See also
List of towns and villages in Ireland

External links
1889 Directory

References

Towns and villages in County Tipperary